Synaphea obtusata is a shrub endemic to Western Australia.

The low rounded shrub typically grows to  that blooms between July and November producing yellow flowers.

It is found on stony hillsides and sand plains in the Wheatbelt, Great Southern and Goldfields-Esperance regions of Western Australia where it grows in gravelly-sand to loamy soils.

References

Eudicots of Western Australia
obtusata
Endemic flora of Western Australia
Plants described in 1995